The Braddock Infants were a minor league baseball team that played from 1905 to 1907. Based in Braddock, Pennsylvania, the club was a member of the Ohio–Pennsylvania League in 1905 and the Pennsylvania–Ohio–Maryland League from 1906 to 1907. It is the only known professional baseball team to be based in Braddock.

The team produced several future major league players such as Ody Abbott, Andy Bruckmiller, Fred Hartman, Alex Jones, Harvey Cushman, Cal Vasbinder and Lee Viau.

Year-by-year record

References

Baseball teams established in 1905
Defunct minor league baseball teams
1905 establishments in Pennsylvania
Defunct baseball teams in Pennsylvania
Baseball teams disestablished in 1907
Ohio-Pennsylvania League teams